National Cycle Route 18 (NCR18) runs from Canterbury to Royal Tunbridge Wells. It follows the valley of the River Stour to Ashford and then runs through the High Weald via Tenterden.

Route

Canterbury to Ashford

Canterbury | Chartham | Wye | Ashford

Ashford to Royal Tunbridge Wells

Ashford | Shadoxhurst | Tenterden | Bedgebury Forest | Pembury | Royal Tunbridge Wells

This section is mostly on roads, except for the section through Bedgebury Forest.

External links
 Weald On Wheels leaflet (with detailed instructions for the Ashford to Tenterden section)

National Cycle Routes
Transport in Kent